William Sheffield Cowles (August 1, 1846 – May 1, 1923) was a rear admiral in the United States Navy.

Naval career
In July 1863 he was appointed an acting midshipman at the United States Naval Academy and graduated in June 1867.  He was commissioned as an ensign in December 1868.  He rose through the ranks and was commissioned as a commander in June 1898.

Cowles commanded the gunboat,  during the Spanish–American War, and served as naval aide to President McKinley.

He served as the Commander-in-Chief, Asiatic Fleet, and retired from the Navy in August 1908 after 45 years in service.

He was a companion of the District of Columbia Commandery of the Military Order of the Loyal Legion of the United States and an honorary companion of the Connecticut Commandery of the Military Order of Foreign Wars.

On December 2, 1908, Cowles submitted a report, prepared by Lieutenant George C. Sweet, recommending the purchase of aircraft suitable for operating from naval ships on scouting and observation mission to the Secretary of the Navy.

Cowles was an official representative at the coronation of King George V in 1911.

Personal life
Cowles married Mary Thurman, the oldest daughter of Ohio politician Allen G. Thurman, on February 18, 1873. In November 1889, Thurman divorced Cowles. They did not have any children.

On November 25, 1895, he married Anna "Bamie" Roosevelt, daughter of philanthropist Theodore Roosevelt Sr. and socialite Martha Stewart "Mittie" Bulloch and elder sister of President Theodore "T.R." Roosevelt Jr. William and Bamie had one son, William Jr. (1898–1986), who was a Connecticut State Representative and Mayor of Farmington, Connecticut. William and Bamie are buried at Riverside Cemetery in Farmington, Connecticut.

References

External links

1846 births
1923 deaths
United States Navy rear admirals (upper half)
People from Farmington, Connecticut
Roosevelt family
Military aides to the President of the United States
Military personnel from Connecticut
Bulloch family
Burials in Connecticut